Pullea may refer to:
 Pullea (plant), a plant genus in the family Cunoniaceae
 Pullea (mite), a mite genus in the family Carpoglyphidae